The Statutory Instruments Act 1946 is an Act of the United Kingdom Parliament which governs the making of statutory instruments. Until 2011 the Act also governed Scottish statutory instruments made under Acts of the Scottish Parliament.

References

External links

United Kingdom Acts of Parliament 1946